Events in the year 2011 in Eritrea.

Incumbents 

 President: Isaias Afewerki

Events 

 12 June – The Nabro stratovolcano in the Southern Red Sea Region begins to erupts.

Deaths

References 

 
2010s in Eritrea
Years of the 21st century in Eritrea
Eritrea
Eritrea